The eighth season of the American drama television series 24, also known as Day 8, premiered in the United States on Fox on January 17, 2010. The eighth season was announced as the final season of 24 and its series finale aired on May 24, 2010. However, the series returned with a ninth season  as 24: Live Another Day, which aired in 2014. The season's storyline begins and ends at 4:00 p.m.

Season overview
Set 18 months after season 7, the story arc involves Jack Bauer contending with assassination threats made during a peace conference between President of the United States Allison Taylor and President Omar Hassan of the fictional Islamic Republic of Kamistan (IRK). The season is set in New York City, with CTU's New York City Office having been re-activated, but while there were originally no plans for filming in New York due to budget constraints, some scenes were shot on-location.

The three main acts of season eight are:
 CTU pursues Hassan's brother who is working with the Russian mafia to have nuclear rods transported to his home country.
 Multiple government agencies pursue Kamistani terrorists who kill Farhad Hassan and attempt to strike at America directly.
 Jack wages a one-man war against the members of the Russian government who are responsible for the conspiracy after Allison Taylor refuses to do anything that could jeopardize the treaty.

Major subplots
 Jack worries that Renee Walker has become a danger to herself and others.
 A relatively inexperienced CTU team is limited in its ability to help Jack.
 Dana Walsh fears that she will lose her job when a stalker threatens to reveal that she has a criminal record.
 A mole at CTU helps the terrorists evade authorities.
 Extremists in the Taylor administration believe that the safest option is to give in to the terrorist demands.
 Charles Logan makes a return and wishes to exact revenge on Jack Bauer.
 Chloe O'Brian attempts to rein Jack in before his rampage either gets him killed or cause an international crisis.

Summary
The signing of an important treaty between the US and the IRK (Islamic Republic of Kamistan) is about to take place at the UN. Kamistani terrorists, resentful of America and disappointed at Hassan's willingness to concede their attempts at developing nuclear weapons, choose this day to attempt to assassinate the Kamistani president, Omar Hassan. The assassination attempt is initially led by Hassan's brother Farhad.

CTU learns from the rescue of Hassan that terrorists have a plan to acquire nuclear rods from the Russian mob. With the help of Renee Walker, who is struggling to keep her life together, Jack goes undercover and forces the cooperation of Sergei Bazhaev's mob family. The nuclear rods are given to Samir Mehran, when Bazhaev's older son Josef betrays him for killing his younger brother Oleg who was exposed to the rods and was suffering from radiation poisoning who plans to make a dirty bomb on American soil. Hassan's head of security, Tarin Faroush is revealed to be a part of Mehran's group and they present an ultimatum to Taylor's government — she must hand over Hassan for execution or the bomb will be detonated.

When Taylor orders that Hassan still be protected at all costs, a US black-ops team attempts to kidnap him. Jack Bauer and the rest of Hassan's protective detail kill all but one member of the team but upon learning of the ultimatum, Hassan turns himself into Mehran. With the nuclear crisis averted, CTU agents attempt to save Hassan and close in on Mehran. However, they arrive to see that Hassan has already been assassinated. Taylor is able to resurrect the treaty by convincing Hassan's wife Dalia to assume her husband's position as interim President and to sign the treaty on her country's behalf.

Considering their duties to be over, Jack and Renee return to his apartment where they have a romantic encounter. However, a Russian assassin follows them there and fires through the windows to tie up loose ends. Renee is hit and a frantic race ensues as Jack rushes her to the hospital. She dies on arrival whereupon Jack  vows to avenge her death and bring everyone involved in the conspiracy and cover-up to justice. He learns that the Russian government are behind everything as they see the treaty as a threat to their influence in the world and supported and funded Mehran's group to destroy the peace process. Allison Taylor though outraged by the conspiracy, still believes that good can come from the signing and decides to continue with the proceedings. She fears that Jack's actions will be enough to have the treaty called off and orders his lockdown. Jack frees himself and at the cost of a third world war, begins to hunt down and kill every member of the conspiracy that killed Walker and Hassan. Chloe who has assumed control of CTU is forced to issue a manhunt for Jack. This leads to a cat and mouse game when Charles Logan approaches Allison Taylor and offers to use the unique resources at his disposal to capture Bauer. Chloe has her authority challenged when Logan has Jason Pillar installed at CTU and tries to prevent him and Logan from having Jack assassinated before he can expose the cover up.   

Jack kills Dana Walsh (the mole at CTU), Mikhail Novakovich (the Russian Foreign Minister) and Pavel Tokarev (the assassin who killed Renee). After ambushing Logan, Jack learns that Russian President Yuri Suvarov, who has arrived in New York for the signing is the mastermind behind the conspiracy. Jack aims a sniper rifle at Logan's office and orders him to lure Suvarov there so he can murder them both. Logan is forced to agree and Jack prepares to pull the trigger, but Chloe talks him out of it at the last second. When President Taylor has free rein to sign the treaty and have Jack permanently silenced she has a change of heart and turns herself in to the Attorney General. Wanted by Russian and American forces Jack says goodbye to Chloe who is watching him through the camera feed of a predator drone. She orders that the feed be turned off and sees Jack disappear from the screen as he disappears from her life.

Characters

Starring
 Kiefer Sutherland as Jack Bauer (24 episodes)
 Mary Lynn Rajskub as Chloe O'Brian (24 episodes)
 Anil Kapoor as Kamistan President Omar Hassan (15 episodes)
 Annie Wersching as Renee Walker (13 episodes)
 Mykelti Williamson as Brian Hastings (17 episodes)
 Katee Sackhoff as Dana Walsh (20 episodes)
 Chris Diamantopoulos as Rob Weiss (12 episodes)
 John Boyd as Arlo Glass (24 episodes)
 Freddie Prinze Jr. as Cole Ortiz (24 episodes)
 Cherry Jones as President Allison Taylor (20 episodes)

Special guest stars
 Gregory Itzin as Charles Logan (8 episodes)
 Elisha Cuthbert as Kim Bauer (2 episodes)

Guest starring

Episodes

Production
Starting with episode 18, Chip Johannessen was promoted to executive producer by the production company Imagine Television. An interview with Kiefer Sutherland seemed to indicate that season eight would take place within very close proximity to the closing events of season seven, but ultimately the story picked up more than a year after the events of the previous season. The show got permission to shoot in the UN building in New York City but Kiefer Sutherland said that they would "probably use that primarily for exteriors".

Trailer
In October 2009, the debut trailer for Season 8 aired on Fox. It was titled "Survive" and hinted that the eighth season would be the last with the line "All Jack Bauer has to do is survive one more day." The trailer shows Jack relaxing with his family and being warned about the impending threat to President Hassan's life. On November 26, 2009 a second trailer was released which featured the song "Run This Town" by Jay-Z.

Reception
On the review aggregator website Metacritic, the eighth season scored 67 out of 100, based on 19 reviews, indicating "Generally favorable reviews". On Rotten Tomatoes, the season has an approval rating of 75% with an average score of 7.4 out of 10 based on 40 reviews. The website's critical consensus reads, "It often feels like the same ol', same ol', but as Jack Bauer, Kiefer Sutherland continues to deliver in 24s final day(s)."

Gregory Itzin, who played former President Charles Logan this season, was nominated for Best Guest Actor in a Drama Series, four years after getting the nomination for Best Supporting Actor in a Drama Series. The series also received the nomination for the Television Critics Association Heritage Award. In a review by IGN, the writing in Season 8 was compared negatively to the writing in other seasons with "It's always difficult to see a once vibrant and exciting show clearly drop in quality...the 24 writers simply didn't play fair – because there was no way the Dana from the beginning of the season could have been the Dana we saw later...This plot twist took an already frustrating character and made her even more of a mess."

Award nominations

Home media releases

References

External links
 

24 (TV series)
2010 American television seasons
Weapons of mass destruction in fiction
Works about the Russian Mafia